Health board may refer to:

District health boards in New Zealand
Health Board (Estonia)
Health board (Ireland)
Local board of health, in England and Wales from 1848 to 1894
Local health boards in Wales
National Board of Health (Denmark)
NHS Scotland#Regional health boards